2001: A Space Odyssey is an oversized American comic book adaptation of the 1968 film of the same name as well as a ten-issue monthly series which expanded upon the concepts presented in the Stanley Kubrick film and the novel by Arthur C. Clarke.  Jack Kirby wrote and pencilled both the adaptation and the series, which were published by Marvel Comics beginning in 1976. The adaptation was part of the agreement of Kirby's return to Marvel.

Treasury edition

Marvel published the adaptation in its then-common treasury edition format featuring tabloid-sized pages of roughly twice the size of a standard American comic book. The story is a close adaptation of the events of the film, but differs in the fact that Kirby incorporated additional dialog from two other sources: the Clarke/Kubrick novel and a copy of an earlier draft script of the film that included the more colloquial-sounding version of HAL 9000, as originally voiced by actor Martin Balsam before Douglas Rain took over. In addition, the comic narrative captions describe the characters' thoughts and feelings, a significantly different approach from that taken by the film.

The treasury edition also contained a 10-page article entitled "2001: A Space Legacy" written by David Anthony Kraft.

Monthly series

Shortly after the publication of the treasury edition, Kirby continued to explore the concepts of 2001 in a monthly comic book series of the same name, the first issue of which was cover dated December 1976. In this issue, Kirby followed the pattern established in the film.  Once again the reader encounters a prehistoric man ("Beast-Killer") who gains new insight upon encountering a Monolith as did Moon-Watcher in the film.  The scene then shifts, where a descendant of Beast-Killer is part of a space mission to explore yet another Monolith.  When he finds it, this Monolith begins to transform the astronaut into a Star Child, called in the comic a "New Seed".

Issues #1–6 of the series replay the same idea with different characters in different situations, both prehistoric and futuristic. In #7 (June 1977), the comic opens with the birth of a New Seed who then travels the galaxy witnessing the suffering that men cause each other. While the New Seed is unable or unwilling to prevent this devastation, he takes the essence of two doomed lovers and uses it to seed another planet with the potential for human life.

In issue #8 (July 1977), Kirby introduces Mister Machine, who is later renamed Machine Man. Mister Machine is an advanced robot designated X-51. All the other robots in the X series go on a rampage as they achieve sentience and are destroyed.  X-51, supported by both the love of his creator Dr. Abel Stack and an encounter with a Monolith, transcends the malfunction that destroyed his siblings. After the death of Dr. Stack, X-51 takes the name Aaron Stack and begins to blend into humanity. Issues #9 and 10, the final issues of the series, continue the story of X-51 as he flees destruction at the hands of the Army.

In other media
Allusions are made to the series in the Agents of S.H.I.E.L.D. season 3 episode "4,722 Hours".

See also
 List of comics based on films
 Marvel Treasury Edition

References

Further reading
 Marvel Comics: The Untold Story by Sean Howe. New York City: Harper, 2012. 485 pp. .

External links 
 
 

1976 comics debuts
1977 comics endings
Adaptations of works by Arthur C. Clarke
American comics
Comics based on films
Comics based on novels
Comics by Jack Kirby
Comics set in the 21st century
Defunct American comics
Space Odyssey